Gonka I was a Telugu king and the first of Velanati Chodas who ruled from 1076 to 1108.

Gonka I ruled as a vassal to Kulottunga I of Later Cholas of Gangaikonda Cholapuram, and his son Mammadi Varma, viceroy of Vengi. He fought as general in the battles against Kalyani Chalukyas and also against refractory vassals, Kalinga and Chakrakuta, who joined with Kalyani Chalukyas. He assumed the title Chola Mula Stambha(The pillar of Chola empire). His kingdom included the region from Gundlakamma in south to Tripurantakam in West.

References
 Durga Prasad, History of the Andhras up to 1565 A. D., P. G. PUBLISHERS, GUNTUR (1988)
 South Indian Inscriptions - http://www.whatisindia.com/inscriptions/

Velanati Chodas
11th-century Indian monarchs
12th-century Indian monarchs